Darlene Taylor is a fictional character from the British Channel 4 soap opera Hollyoaks, played by Sarah Lawrence between 2003 and 2006.

Storylines
The archetypal moody teenager had to move in with her father’s partner Liz and her children. Darlene found it difficult and did not get along with Liz or her son Justin. Darlene refused to compromise and tried often enough to split her father and Liz's relationship up. No matter how hard Darlene tried, her plans backfired when her father and Liz wed and Darlene had to live with this. Things got worse when Justin found out his dad had committed suicide rather than had a heart attack like his mother had told him. This made Justin turn to drugs and Darlene was angry that Liz couldn't control him. However, Darlene faced the shock of her life on her 18th birthday when out of control Justin ended up pushing Darlene through a glass window. This left her with scars on her face that she found difficult to deal with and left her angry at Justin. Afterwards, Darlene never attended school or faced the outside world. However, with her father, Liz and her good friend Craig Dean supporting her, the pair both managed to arrange for Darlene to have plastic surgery for the scars on her face. After returning, Darlene had seen that Justin had changed after being sent into a boot camp and forgave him.

However, things went from bad to worse for Darlene when both she and Ali were being bullied at school by racist thug Stephen Mackintosh. Macki was easier on Darlene as he found her attractive, but treated Ali horribly. It ended up in a tragedy when Ali stabbed Macki and later was run over by a car resulting in the deaths of both Ali and Macki. The blame for Macki’s death went on Justin and he faced a tough trial where Darlene’s testimony was to be crucial. Despite the fact that at first she blamed Justin for the death of her brother (as Macki used to be his friend, when he was on drugs), she eventually realised that Justin was innocent and decided to give evidence for him. She told the jury that Macki had bullied Ali so badly that it was possible that he could have reached a breaking point and fought back.

Through those difficult times, she also lost her father who moved out of the house after Liz discovered that he had been having an affair. Instead of going with her father, she stayed with the Burtons and Liz. Justin and the twins made it clear they thought of Darlene as part of their family. She found comfort in the arms of Craig Dean but despite him falling for her, Darlene often manipulated him. After Liz deciding on moving to Colchester, Darlene moved in at The Dog in The Pond after convincing to Craig that Liz threw her out. She caused havoc in The Dog in The Pond after she tried to seduce Craig's stepbrother Darren Osborne but then told Craig it was Darren that was trying to seduce her. However, Darlene’s games soon backfired on her when she was tricked by Darren into sleeping with her as Craig walked in on them. Darlene tried to claim that Darren had raped her but a hurt Craig saw straight through it and told Darlene to leave. She continued to play her games, this time with Liz as she accused Jack Osborne on trying to come on to her. However, after Liz got the full story from Jack she decided no longer to put up with Darlene’s behaviour and wanted Darlene out of the house. Having burnt all her bridges, Darlene then decided the best thing to do was move in with her mum and depart Hollyoaks for good.

Reception
The Sunday Mercury described her as a "nasty teenager".

References

External links
 Character profile at Hollyoaks.com

Taylor, Darlene
Taylor, Darlene
Taylor, Darlene
Taylor, Darlene